Álvaro Damián Navarro Bica (born January 28, 1985) is a Uruguayan forward who plays for Defensor Sporting.

Honours
Botafogo
Campeonato Brasileiro Série B: 2015

External links
 

1985 births
Living people
People from Tacuarembó
Uruguayan footballers
Uruguayan expatriate footballers
Defensor Sporting players
Club de Gimnasia y Esgrima La Plata footballers
Godoy Cruz Antonio Tomba footballers
Cobresal footballers
C.D. Olmedo footballers
Botafogo de Futebol e Regatas players
Club Puebla players
Uruguayan Primera División players
Chilean Primera División players
Argentine Primera División players
Campeonato Brasileiro Série B players
Liga MX players
Uruguayan expatriate sportspeople in Chile
Uruguayan expatriate sportspeople in Argentina
Uruguayan expatriate sportspeople in Brazil
Uruguayan expatriate sportspeople in Mexico
Uruguayan expatriate sportspeople in Ecuador
Expatriate footballers in Chile
Expatriate footballers in Argentina
Expatriate footballers in Brazil
Expatriate footballers in Mexico
Expatriate footballers in Ecuador
Association football forwards